Del Frisco's Restaurant Group is an American steakhouse restaurant chain company which focuses on steaks. The company was founded in 1981 and became public in 2012. Del Frisco's Restaurant Group currently operates Del Frisco's Double Eagle Steak House, Del Frisco's Grille, Barcelona Wine Bar and Bartaco with 73 locations across 16 states in the United States. Market capitalization at the end of 2017 was US$327.84M.

History

On September 21, 2018, Del Frisco's sold Sullivan's Steakhouse to Romano's Macaroni Grill for 32 million dollars (USD).

In June 2019 Del Frisco accepted an offer from L Catterton in the vicinity of $650 million cash. L Catterton will also purchase Del Frisco stock for $8.00 a share, as June 26, 2019 the closing price of Del Frisco stock was $7.94.

References

External links

Landry's Inc.
Companies formerly listed on the Nasdaq
Companies based in Irving, Texas
American companies established in 1981
Restaurants established in 1981
1981 establishments in Texas]
Catering and food service companies of the United States
Restaurant groups in the United States
2012 initial public offerings
2019 mergers and acquisitions
Private equity portfolio companies